Sallie Harmsen (born May 2, 1989) is a Dutch actress having had roles in In Real Life for which she won Golden Calf for Best Actress at the Netherlands Film Festival 2008. Harmsen appeared in De Geheimen van Barslet Golden Calf for Best Actress in a TV drama in 2012. She has been recognised for her work in The Heineken Kidnapping (2011), Polleke, Vrijdag, and Tasso (2014-2015), Accused (Lucia de B.) (2014), and Moloch (2022).

Career
Sallie Harmsen was born May 2, 1989. As an actress she achieved notoriety for her role as Simone in In Real Life, for which she won Golden Calf for Best Actress at the Netherlands Film Festival 2008.

In 2015 it was announced that Harmsen would be co-starring with Robert de Hoog in a television series based on the American outlaws Bonnie and Clyde. 
Harmsen portrayed the female replicant that was 'born' in the 2017 film Blade Runner 2049.

Filmography

Film
Guernsey (2005, as Buurmeisje)
Winky's Horse (2005, as Sofie)
The Making Of (2007, as Zusje)
Where Is Winky's Horse? (2007, as Sofie)
The Muse (2007)
In Real Life (2008, as Simone)
The Aviatrix of Kazbek (2010, as Kaat)
Sterke verhalen (2010, as Sanne)
Loft (2010, as Sarah Lunter)
Pizza Maffia (2011, as Alice)
The Heineken Kidnapping (2011, as Lisa)
Bowy is inside (2012, as Sarah)
Tricked (2012, as Nadja)
Kenau (2014, as Kathelijne)
Accused (2014, as Judith Jansen)
Het mooiste wat er is (2015, as Dominique)
Blade Runner 2049 (2017, as Replicant)
The Postcard Killings (2020, as Nienke Holl)
Mitra (2021, as Clara)
Moloch (2022, as Betriek)

Television
Snacken (2004, as Sanne - TV film)
Flikken Maastricht (2008, 1 episode, as Sanne Richters)
Alex in Amsterdam (2009, as Lotte - TV short)
Hart tegen Hard (2011, 1 episode, as Brenda Freriks)
De geheimen van Barslet (2011, 5 episodes, as Manon de Vries)
Uncle Hank (2012, as Sophie - TV film)
Over (2012, as Emma - TV film)
Het sinterklaasjournaal (2014, 1 episode, as Jufvrouw)
Heirs of the Night (2019, as Tonka)
Devils (2020–)

Short film
Brommermeisjes (2005, as Kiki)
Het beloofde pand (2010, as Julie)
"Cesqeaux & San Holo - Who Am I [Official Music Video]" (2016 as Denise)

Theater
Komt u maar (2010)
Breaking The News (2012)
Midsummer Night's Dream (2012)
The Stone Bridal Bed (2013)
The Wannsee Conference (2013)
Vrijdag (2014, as Christiane)
Tasso (2014, as Eleonore)
Elektra (2014, as Chrysothemis)
Polleke (2015, as Polleke)
Three Sisters (2015, as Irina)

Awards and nominations

References

External links
 
 

1989 births
Living people
Actresses from Amsterdam
Dutch film actresses
Dutch stage actresses
Dutch television actresses
21st-century Dutch actresses